Roadrunner Field is a college baseball stadium in San Antonio, Texas, United States on the main campus of the University of Texas at San Antonio.  It is home to the UTSA Roadrunners baseball team, and seats 800.  The stadium was opened in 1993.  The stadium features a press box with seating for eight, and three indoor batting cages.  In 2006, the stadium was renovated, and outfitted with lights that allowed games to be played at night.

See also
 List of NCAA Division I baseball venues

References

External links 
UTSA athletics facilities

UTSA Roadrunners baseball
College baseball venues in the United States
Baseball venues in San Antonio
Baseball venues in Texas
1993 establishments in Texas
Sports venues completed in 1993